BR Klassik is a Munich-based public radio station and classical record label owned and operated by Bayerischer Rundfunk.

References

Radio stations in Germany
Radio stations established in 1980
1980 establishments in West Germany
Mass media in Munich
Bayerischer Rundfunk